Anthony Obinna Njokuani  (born March 1, 1980) is a Nigerian-American professional mixed martial artist and kickboxer. A professional competitor since 2001, Njokuani has also formerly competed for the UFC, WEC, and ONE Championship.

Background
Born in Enugu, Nigeria on March 1, 1980, Anthony Njokuani and his family immigrated to the United States in 1983, settling in Garland, Texas. Njokuani began his martial arts training in Tae Kwon Do at the age of 17 before later moving on to Muay Thai and then mixed martial arts at the age of 21. Njokuani's younger brother, Chidi Njokuani, is also a professional mixed martial artist.

Career

Early career (2001–2008)
Njokuani began his professional career in 1999, initially fighting as a kickboxer. He enjoyed some success in the sport by compiling a 24–0 record and winning the Kansas state Muay Thai title. He turned his hand to mixed martial arts in 2003 and became champion of the Texas-based Art of War promotion in 2007 before making a brief return to kickboxing to compete for the Oklahoma Destroyers in the -74.3 kg/164 lb division in the team-based World Combat League promotion during the 2007-08 season.

Having compiled a 9–1 (1) MMA record by 2008, Njokuani signed with World Extreme Cagefighting.

World Extreme Cagefighting (2009–2010)
Njokuani made his promotional debut on January 25, 2009, at WEC 38, losing to future WEC Lightweight Champion and future UFC Lightweight Champion, Benson Henderson via second round submission.

Njokuani was expected to face Anthony Pettis on April 5, 2009, at WEC 40.  However, Pettis pulled out of the fight with a hand injury and was replaced by Bart Palaszewski.  Njokuani defeated Palaszewski via TKO in the second round.

Njokuani next face Muhsin Corbbrey on October 10, 2009, at WEC 43.  Njokuani defeated Corbbrey via second-round TKO.

Njokuani fought IFL veteran Chris Horodecki, who made his WEC debut on December 19, 2009, at WEC 45. Njokuani won via first-round TKO, earning the Knockout of the Night award for the third consecutive time in the WEC.

Njokuani faced Shane Roller at WEC 48 on April 24, 2010. He lost the fight via first round rear-naked choke submission.

He was defeated by newcomer Maciej Jewtuszko via first-round TKO at WEC 50.

Njokuani defeated WEC newcomer Edward Faaloloto via second-round TKO on November 11, 2010, at WEC 52.

Ultimate Fighting Championship (2011–2014)
In October 2010, World Extreme Cagefighting merged with the Ultimate Fighting Championship. As part of the merger, all WEC fighters were transferred to the UFC.

In his UFC debut, Njokuani faced touted prospect Edson Barboza on March 19, 2011, at UFC 128. He lost the fight via unanimous decision, but the bout won the Fight of the Night bonus.

Njokuani fought Andre Winner on July 2, 2011, at UFC 132, winning via unanimous decision (30-27, 30-26, 30-26). UFC commentator, Joe Rogan, called it Njokuani's best performance of his career. With this performance, Njokuani became the sixth fighter to land over 100 significant strikes in a single bout.

Njokuani was expected to face Paul Taylor on November 5, 2011, at UFC 138. However, just days before the event, Taylor pulled out of the bout citing an injury. With no time to find a suitable replacement the bout was scrapped.

Njokuani was expected to face Ramsey Nijem on December 30, 2011, at UFC 141.  However, Nijem was forced out the bout with an injury and replaced by Danny Castillo. He lost the fight via split decision.

Njokuani defeated John Makdessi on April 21, 2012, at UFC 145 via unanimous decision (30-27, 30-27, 30-27).

Njokuani was expected to face Paul Taylor on July 11, 2012, at UFC on Fuel TV: Munoz vs. Weidman.  However, Taylor was forced out of the bout with yet another injury and replaced by Rafael dos Anjos. Njokuani lost the fight via unanimous decision, and was sidelined for six months as he recovered from surgery to repair a broken right hand suffered in the bout.

Njokuani faced debuting Strikeforce fighter Roger Bowling on April 20, 2013, at UFC on Fox 7. He won the fight via KO in the second round.

A bout with Paul Taylor was scheduled for the third time and was expected to take place on October 26, 2013, at UFC Fight Night 30. However, Taylor was forced to pull out of the bout once again with another injury and later retired. Taylor was replaced this time by Al Iaquinta. On September 24, Njokuani also pulled out of the event with an injury. and was replaced by Piotr Hallmann.

After over a year away from the cage, Njokuani returned to face Vinc Pichel on May 24, 2014, at UFC 173. He lost the fight via unanimous decision.

Njokuani faced Daron Cruickshank on October 4, 2014, at UFC Fight Night: MacDonald vs. Saffiedine. He lost the fight by unanimous decision, and was subsequently released from the promotion.

Legacy Fighting Championship (2014–present)
Just two days after his UFC release was announced, it was announced that Njokuani had signed a multi-fight deal with Legacy FC. He made his debut against David Burrow at Legacy FC 38 on February 13, 2015. Despite dominating the first two rounds via his stand up, Njokuani lost the fight via submission in the third round.

Lion Fight
On February 3, 2017, Njokuani returned to Muay Thai action at Lion Fight 34 at the Tropicana in Las Vegas. He defeated Australia's Chris Harrington by third round (T)KO to keep his undefeated record.

ONE Championship
On October 6, 2018, Njokuani made his ONE Championship debut in Bangkok, Thailand against former K-1 World MAX and shoot boxing champion Andy Souwer at ONE Championship: Kingdom of Heroes. He won by split decision.

On February 22, 2019, he faced future ONE Lightweight Kickboxing World Champion Regian Eersel in Singapore at ONE Championship: Call to Greatness. Njokuani lost by second-round knockout. Afterwards, he tried to overturn the result of the fight due to Eersel landing an elbow but the ruling was upheld.

Gamebred Fighting Championship 

Njokuani faced Wesley Golden on December 17, 2021, at Gamebred Fighting Championship 3. He won the bout via ground and pound TKO in the first round.

Eagle Fighting Championship 
Njokuani faced Raimond Magomedaliev on January 28, 2022, at Eagle FC 44. He lost by first-round technical knockout.

Championships and accomplishments

Kickboxing
Kansas State Kickboxing
Kansas State Muay Thai Champion

Mixed Martial Arts
Art of War
Art of War Lightweight Championship
Ultimate Fighting Championship
Fight of the Night (One time) vs. Edson Barboza 
World Extreme Cagefighting
Knockout of the Night (Three times) vs. Bart Palaszewski, Muhsin Corbbrey and Chris Horodecki

Mixed martial arts record

|-
|Loss
|align=center|17–13 (1)
|Raimond Magomedaliev
|TKO (punches)
|Eagle FC 44
|
|align=center|1
|align=center|2:49
|Miami, United States
|
|-
|Win
|align=center|17–12 (1)
|Wesley Golden
|TKO (punches)
|Gamebred Fighting Championship 3
|
|align=center| 1
|align=center| 4:38
|Biloxi, Mississippi, United States
|
|-
|Loss
|align=center|16–12 (1)
|Leonardo Mafra
|Decision (unanimous)
|FFC 25 - Mitchell vs. Lopez
|
|align=center|3
|align=center|5:00
|Springfield, Massachusetts, United States
|
|-
|Loss
|align=center|16–11 (1)
|Josh Quayhagen
|Decision (split)
|Legacy Fighting Championship 42
|
|align=center|3
|align=center|5:00
|Lake Charles, Louisiana, United States
|
|-
|Loss
|align=center|16–10 (1)
|David Burrow
|Submission (armbar)
|Legacy Fighting Championship 38
|
|align=center|3
|align=center|1:28
|Allen, Texas, United States
|
|-
|Loss
|align=center|16–9 (1)
|Daron Cruickshank
|Decision (unanimous)
|UFC Fight Night: MacDonald vs. Saffiedine
|
|align=center|3
|align=center|5:00
|Halifax, Nova Scotia, Canada
|
|-
|Loss
|align=center|16–8 (1)
|Vinc Pichel
|Decision (unanimous)
|UFC 173
|
|align=center| 3
|align=center| 5:00
|Las Vegas, Nevada, United States
|
|-
|Win
|align=center|16–7 (1)
|Roger Bowling
|KO (punch)
|UFC on Fox: Henderson vs. Melendez
|
|align=center| 2
|align=center| 2:52
|San Jose, California, United States
|
|-
|Loss
|align=center|15–7 (1)
|Rafael dos Anjos
|Decision (unanimous)
|UFC on Fuel TV: Munoz vs. Weidman
|
|align=center| 3
|align=center| 5:00
|San Jose, California, United States
|
|-
|Win
|align=center|15–6 (1)
|John Makdessi
|Decision (unanimous)
|UFC 145
|
|align=center| 3
|align=center| 5:00
|Atlanta, Georgia, United States
|
|-
|Loss
|align=center|14–6 (1)
|Danny Castillo
|Decision (split)
|UFC 141
|
|align=center| 3
|align=center| 5:00
|Las Vegas, Nevada, United States
|
|-
|Win
|align=center|14–5 (1)
|Andre Winner
|Decision (unanimous)
|UFC 132
|
|align=center|3
|align=center|5:00
|Las Vegas, Nevada, United States
|
|-
|Loss
|align=center|13–5 (1)
|Edson Barboza
|Decision (unanimous)
|UFC 128
|
|align=center|3
|align=center|5:00
|Newark, New Jersey, United States
|
|-
|Win
|align=center|13–4 (1)
|Edward Faaloloto
|TKO (elbow)
|WEC 52
|
|align=center|2
|align=center|4:54
|Las Vegas, Nevada, United States
|
|-
|Loss
|align=center|12–4 (1)
|Maciej Jewtuszko
|TKO (punches)
|WEC 50
|
|align=center|1
|align=center|1:36
|Las Vegas, Nevada, United States
|
|-
|Loss
|align=center|12–3 (1)
|Shane Roller
|Submission (rear-naked choke)
|WEC 48
|
|align=center|1
|align=center|3:21
|Sacramento, California, United States
|
|-
|Win
|align=center|12–2 (1)
|Chris Horodecki
|TKO (head kick and punches)
|WEC 45
|
|align=center|1
|align=center|3:33
|Las Vegas, Nevada, United States
|
|-
|Win
|align=center|11–2 (1)
|Muhsin Corbbrey
|TKO (punches)
|WEC 43
|
|align=center|2
|align=center|1:42
|San Antonio, Texas, United States
|
|-
|Win
|align=center|10–2 (1)
|Bart Palaszewski
|TKO (punches)
|WEC 40
|
|align=center|2
|align=center|0:27
|Chicago, Illinois, United States
|
|-
|Loss
|align=center|9–2 (1)
|Benson Henderson
|Submission (guillotine choke)
|WEC 38
|
|align=center|2
|align=center|0:42
|San Diego, California, United States
|
|-
|Win
|align=center|9–1 (1)
|Aaron Williams
|TKO (knees)
|SWC 1: Inception
|
|align=center|1
|align=center|2:28
|Garland, Texas, United States
|
|-
|Win
|align=center|8–1 (1)
|Keyon Mike Jackson
|KO (knee)
|Art of War 3
|
|align=center|1
|align=center|2:14
|Dallas, Texas, United States
|
|-
|Loss
|align=center|7–1 (1)
|Donald Cerrone
|Submission (triangle choke)
|ROF 29: Aftershock
|
|align=center|1
|align=center|4:30
|Broomfield, Colorado, United States
|
|-
|Win
|align=center|7–0 (1)
|Kenneth Rosfort-Nees
|KO (punch)
|Art of War 1
|
|align=center|1
|align=center|2:12
|Dallas, Texas, United States
|
|-
|Win
|align=center|6–0 (1)
|Jason Palacios
|Decision (unanimous)
|Lonestar Beatdown
|
|align=center|3
|align=center|3:00
|College Station, Texas, United States
|
|-
|Win
|align=center|5–0 (1)
|Steven Bratland
|Decision (unanimous)
|UTS 6
|
|align=center|3
|align=center|5:00
|Frisco, Texas, United States
|
|-
|Win
|align=center|4–0 (1)
|Ira Boyd
|Decision (unanimous)
|UTS 5
|
|align=center|3
|align=center|5:00
|Frisco, Texas, United States 
|
|-
|Win
|align=center|3–0 (1)
|Devon Miller
|KO (punches)
|UTS 4
|
|align=center|2
|align=center|0:55
|Frisco, Texas, United States
|
|-
|Win
|align=center|2–0 (1)
|Ben Dauck
|Decision (unanimous)
|Inferno Promotions: Meltdown
|
|align=center|3
|align=center|5:00
|Plano, Texas, United States
|
|-
|NC
|align=center|1–0 (1)
|James Martinez
|No Contest (premature stoppage)
|Venom: First Strike
|
|align=center|1
|align=center|2:47
|Huntington Beach, California, United States
|
|-
|Win
|align=center|1–0
|Lee King
|Decision (unanimous)
|REF: Austin Fights
|
|align=center|3
|align=center|5:00
|Austin, Texas, United States
|

Kickboxing record 

|-
|-  style="background:#CCFFCC;"
| 2019-10-28|| Win ||align=left| Elliot Compton ||  |ONE Hero Series October || Beijing, China || Decision (Unanimous) || 3 || 3:00 
|-
|-  style="background:#FFBBBB;"
| 2019-02-22|| Loss||align=left| Regian Eersel || ONE Championship: Call to Greatness || Kallang, Singapore || KO (punches) || 2 || 1:03
|-
|-  style="background:#CCFFCC;"
| 2018-10-06|| Win ||align=left| Andy Souwer || ONE Championship: Kingdom of Heroes || Bangkok, Thailand || Decision (split) || 3 || 3:00
|-
|- style="background:#fbb;"
|  2017-09-29 || Loss || align="left" | Liam Nolan || Triumphant I Muay Thai Series 1 || Rohnert Park, California, United States || Decision (Split)|| 5 || 3:00
|-
! style=background:white colspan=9 |

|-  style="background:#CCFFCC;"
| 2017-02-03|| Win ||align=left| Chris Harrington || Lion Fight 34 || Las Vegas, Nevada || TKO (3 knockdowns) || 3 || 2:44
|-
|-  style="background:#CCFFCC;"
| 2008-06-07|| Win ||align=left| Thad Campbell || World Combat League || New York, New York, United States || Decision (15-9) || 1 || 3:00
|-
|-  style="background:#CCFFCC;"
| 2008-06-07|| Win ||align=left| Bryan Corley || World Combat League || Austin, Texas || KO (punches) || 1 || 
|-
|-  style="background:#FFBBBB;"
| 2007-10-19|| Loss ||align=left| Kurt Halsey || World Combat League || Oklahoma, United States || Decision (17-11) || 1 || 3:00
|-
|-
| colspan=9 | Legend:

References

External links

Official UFC Profile
Official Anthony Njokuani Tee KO Page

Living people
1980 births
American male kickboxers
Nigerian male kickboxers
Kickboxers from Texas
Kickboxers from Nevada
Middleweight kickboxers
American male mixed martial artists
Nigerian male mixed martial artists
Mixed martial artists from Texas
Mixed martial artists from Nevada
Lightweight mixed martial artists
Mixed martial artists utilizing Muay Thai
American Muay Thai practitioners
Nigerian Muay Thai practitioners
Sportspeople from Enugu
People from Garland, Texas
American people of Igbo descent
Igbo sportspeople
Nigerian emigrants to the United States
Ultimate Fighting Championship male fighters
ONE Championship kickboxers